Albert Bernard (born 16 March 1917, date of death unknown) was a Belgian fencer. He competed in the team épée event at the 1952 Summer Olympics.

References

1917 births
Year of death missing
Belgian male fencers
Belgian épée fencers
Olympic fencers of Belgium
Fencers at the 1952 Summer Olympics